Umberto Lilloni (Milan, 1898–1980) was an Italian painter.

Biography
Lilloni interrupted his studies at the Brera Academy of Fine Arts in 1917 when World War I broke out. Alternating landscape with figure painting in the 1920s, he received his first official recognition with the Prince Umberto Prize in 1927. His participation in the Venice Biennale began in 1928 with the 16th Esposizione Internazionale d’Arte della Città di Venezia. Involvement with the Novecento Italiano movement led to participation in their second group show in Milan in 1929. The influence of Chiarismo can also be seen in the gradual lightening of his palette. His first solo exhibition was held at the Galleria Bardi, Milan, in the same year. While the 1930s saw increased participation in exhibitions, including the Rome Quadrenniale and the Brera exhibitions at the national level, the art world showed less interest in his painting after World War II.

References
 Antonella Crippa, Umberto Lilloni, online catalogue Artgate by Fondazione Cariplo, 2010, CC BY-SA (source for the first revision of this article).

Other projects

1898 births
1980 deaths
19th-century Italian painters
19th-century Italian male artists
Italian male painters
20th-century Italian painters
Italian landscape painters
20th-century Italian male artists